Marcelo Antônio Cartaxo Queiroga Lopes (born 1 December 1963) is a Brazilian cardiologist, who served as minister of health of Brazil, from 23 March 2021 to 31 December 2022. He was appointed by President Jair Bolsonaro to replace outgoing Minister Eduardo Pazuello. Queiroga is the fourth minister of health since the beginning of the COVID-19 pandemic in the country.

Education and early career
Born on 1 December 1963 in the city of João Pessoa, Queiroga holds a degree in medicine from Federal University of Paraíba (1988). He completed his medical residency at the Hospital Adventista Silvestre (1991) and the Hospital Beneficência Portuguesa (1993). In 2010, he completed an doctorate in bioethics at the University of Porto.

Career
He is currently Director of the Department of Hemodynamics and Interventional Cardiology at Hospital Alberto Urquiza Wanderley and interventional cardiologist at Hospital Metropolitano Dom José Maria Pires, both in the state of Paraíba. He also served as a Director of the Brazilian Society of Hemodynamics and Interventional Cardiology between 2012 and 2013. He is a member of the Regional Council of Medicine of the state of Paraíba.

Queiroga currently is serving as president of Brazilian Society of Cardiology (SBC).

Minister of Health
Queiroga was appointed minister of health on 16 March 2021 to succeed outgoing minister Eduardo Pazuello, who served as a minister since April 2020. His term ended on 31 December 2022.

References

1963 births
Living people
People from João Pessoa, Paraíba
Health ministers of Brazil
Brazilian cardiologists
21st-century Brazilian politicians
Federal University of Paraíba alumni
University of Porto alumni